Alfonso Fernández de Bonilla (died 1600) was a Spanish Catholic prelate who served as the Archbishop of Mexico (1593–1600).

On May 22, 1592, Alfonso Fernández de Bonilla was appointed by Pope Clement VIII as Archbishop of Mexico. In 1593, he was consecrated bishop by Toribio Alfonso de Mogrovejo, Archbishop of Lima. He served as Archbishop of Mexico until his death in 1600.

References

1600 deaths
16th-century Roman Catholic archbishops in Mexico
Bishops appointed by Pope Clement VIII
Mexican Roman Catholic archbishops
Spanish Roman Catholic bishops in North America
Year of birth missing